John Joseph Boyle (July 23, 1884March 9, 1944) was an American lawyer who served as the United States Attorney for the Western District of Wisconsin.

Biography
John Joseph Boyle was born to John and Rosanna (Gallagher) Boyle on July 23, 1884, in Gratiot, Wisconsin. He would later reside in Darlington, Wisconsin. A Roman Catholic, he married Mable (Meier) Stansell on June 6, 1916, in Denver, Colorado. The couple had 3 children together: John Jr., Mary and Roseann. Three of his brothers, Wilfred, Bernard and Hugh, were also attorneys. His son, John Jr., would become a judge and his daughter, Mary, married an attorney. He died on March 9, 1944, in Madison, Wisconsin.

Education
Boyle graduated from Creighton University in Omaha, Nebraska.

Career
From 1920-1925, he was district attorney for Lafayette County, Wisconsin. He was nominated for state attorney general in 1928 and 1930. In 1932, he was nominated as the Democratic candidate from the 3rd district for congress and was a delegate to the Democratic National Convention. From 1933-1935, he was an assistant federal prosecutor. Boyle was appointed district attorney for the Western District of Wisconsin by President Roosevelt on February 6, 1935, succeeding Stanley Ryan, and was reappointed in 1939 and 1943, dying less than 5 months into his 3rd term.

References

External links
The Political Graveyard

|-

People from Darlington, Wisconsin
Catholics from Wisconsin
United States Attorneys for the Western District of Wisconsin
District attorneys in Wisconsin
Wisconsin Democrats
1880s births
Year of death missing
People from Gratiot, Wisconsin